The following is a list of albums recorded by Morgana King from the years 1956 to the present.

Albums 
"… It is a parading of the different emotions that each composition contains." Joe Fields

Box sets and compilations

Also appears on

References

Discographies of American artists
Vocal jazz discographies